On December 27, 2020, a man stabbed fourteen people in Kaiyuan, China, killing seven.

Attack
Seven people were killed and seven others injured during a mass stabbing attack near a school in Kaiyuan, in the Liaoning province. As the school was closed at the time of the incident, no students or teachers were hurt. The victims were all passersby, mainly middle-aged or elderly women. The attacker then stabbed and wounded a policeman before being arrested. The suspect, identified as Yang Moufeng, is a man in his 60s.

References

2020 murders in China
December 2020 crimes in Asia
History of Liaoning
Knife attacks
Mass murder in 2020
21st-century mass murder in China
Mass stabbings in China
Massacres in China
Stabbing attacks in 2020
Tieling